In enzymology, a sn-glycerol-1-phosphate dehydrogenase is an enzyme that catalyzes the chemical reaction

sn-glycerol 1-phosphate + NAD(P)+  glycerone phosphate + NAD(P)H + H+

The 3 substrates of this enzyme are sn-glycerol 1-phosphate, NAD+, and NADP+, whereas its 4 products are glycerone phosphate, NADH, NADPH, and H+.

This enzyme belongs to the family of oxidoreductases, specifically those acting on the CH-OH group of donor with NAD+ or NADP+ as acceptor. The systematic name of this enzyme class is sn-glycerol-1-phosphate:NAD(P)+ 2-oxidoreductase. This enzyme is also called glycerol-1-phosphate dehydrogenase [NAD(P)+].

G-1-P dehydrogenase is responsible for the formation of sn-glycerol 1-phosphate, the backbone of the membrane phospholipids of Archaea. The gene encoding glycerol-1-phosphate dehydrogenase has been detected in all the archaeal species and has not been found in any bacterial or eukaryal species. sn-glycerol 1-phosphate produced by this enzyme is the most fundamental difference by which Archaea and bacteria are discriminated.

References

 

EC 1.1.1
NADPH-dependent enzymes
NADH-dependent enzymes
Enzymes of unknown structure